Frédéric Fleig (25 December 1890 – 20 September 1973) was a French rower. He competed in the men's eight event at the 1920 Summer Olympics.

References

External links
 

1890 births
1973 deaths
French male rowers
Olympic rowers of France
Rowers at the 1920 Summer Olympics
Place of birth missing